Parón, is a  mountain in the Cordillera Blanca in the Andes of Peru. Parón lies in Huascarán National Park, northeast of Pirámide.

References

Mountains of Peru
Mountains of Ancash Region
Huascarán National Park